Álvaro Lopes Cançado - nickname Nariz, meaning "nose" (Uberaba, February 8, 1912 - September 19, 1984) was a Brazilian footballer (defender) playing for Brazil national football team in FIFA World Cup 1938 . He played only in one game in that tournament - against Czechoslovakia . His club in that time was Botafogo FR.

References
 Andrzej Gowarzewski : "Fuji Football Encyclopedia : World Cup FIFA*part I* Biographical notes - Heroes of Mundial" ; GiA Katowice 1993

1912 births
1984 deaths
Brazilian footballers
Brazil international footballers
1938 FIFA World Cup players
Botafogo de Futebol e Regatas players
People from Uberaba
Association football defenders
Sportspeople from Minas Gerais